Whiskey for the Holy Ghost is the second solo album by former Screaming Trees vocalist Mark Lanegan. The album builds upon the roots music foundation that Lanegan had established with his debut The Winding Sheet.

Recording
The recording was reportedly a frustrating affair for Lanegan; at one point the singer had to be physically prevented from throwing the master tapes into a river by producer Jack Endino.  In his 2017 book I Am the Wolf: Lyrics and Writings, the singer recalls:

In an interview on WTF with Marc Maron, Lanegan highlighted the making of Whiskey for the Holy Ghost as an instance in his life where his drug use had a positive effect artistically: "Around the time I did my second solo record I decided to smoke weed, and it made me do some stuff that I never had thought about doing – but of course it turned on me, like all drugs."  Despite the album's slow gestation and Lanegan's notorious substance abuse problems, the songs on Whiskey for The Holy Ghost sound remarkably cohesive. Lyrically, Lanegan continues to delve into the darker side of the human experience on songs like "Borracho" and the Biblical "Pendulum." ("Jesus Christ been here and gone, what a painful price to pay.")  In his book I Am the Wolf, Lanegan states that Van Morrison and writer Cormac McCarthy sparked his imagination for the imagery on the album, with Morrison being a direct influence on "Carnival," and admits that "Pendulum" started "as a joke designed to make my musical partner Mike Johnson laugh."

Dan Peters of Mudhoney plays drums on "Borracho" and "House A Home."  "House A Home" was released as a single with an accompanying video. "The River Rise" was used in the 1996 grunge documentary Hype!, where it accompanied a montage filmed at the vigil following Kurt Cobain's death.

Reception

Mark Deming of AllMusic writes, "The songs are more literate and better realized than on the debut, the arrangements are subtle and supportive (often eschewing electric guitars for keyboards and acoustic instruments), and Lanegan's voice, bathed in bourbon and nicotine, transforms the deep sorrow of the country blues (a clear inspiration for this music) into something new, compelling, and entirely his own."

Track listing

Personnel
Mark Lanegan - vocals, acoustic and electric guitars
Mike Johnson - bass, acoustic, electric and slide guitars, organ, piano, harmonica, backing vocals
Frank Cody - piano, organ
Ted Trewhella - piano
Justin Williams - organ
Kurt Fedora - bass
Phil Sparks - bowed and upright bass
Dave Kreuger - violin
Mike Stinette - saxophone
Tad Doyle, J Mascis, Dan Peters, Mark Pickerel - drums
Krisha Augerot, Sally Barry - backing vocals

Production
Produced by Mark Lanegan and Mike Johnson
Recorded by John Agnello, Terry Date, Ed Brooks and Jack Endino
Mixed by John Agnello
Mastered by Bob Ludwig

References

External links
 "House A Home" music video

1994 albums
Mark Lanegan albums
Sub Pop albums